Irving S. Brecher (January 17, 1914 – November 17, 2008) was a screenwriter who wrote for the Marx Brothers among many others; he was the only writer to get sole credit on a Marx Brothers film, penning the screenplays for At the Circus (1939) and Go West (1940). He was also one of the numerous uncredited writers on the screenplay of The Wizard of Oz (1939). Some of his other screenplays were Shadow of the Thin Man (1941), Ziegfeld Follies (1945) and Bye Bye Birdie (1963).

Early years
Born in the Bronx, New York, Brecher's first professional involvement with movies came when he became an usher at a Manhattan, New York movie theater at age 19. Even as a teenager he was writing jokes, sending them to newspaper columnists Walter Winchell and Ed Sullivan on postcards.

Career
He created, produced, and was head writer for the original radio and early TV edition of The Life of Riley. He also wrote for Al Jolson on radio  and later created and co-produced The People's Choice as well.

Brecher's career in screenwriting began in 1937.

Adapting Nathaniel Benchley's novel, he wrote the screenplay for, and directed Sail A Crooked Ship starring Ernie Kovacs and a young Robert Wagner.

He received an Academy Award nomination in 1944 for his screenplay of Meet Me in St Louis.

As an aspiring young comedy writer, Brecher famously placed an ad in Variety looking for work, promising he could write "jokes so bad, even Milton Berle wouldn't steal them."  He was promptly hired by Berle himself.

Brecher, who bore a physical resemblance to Groucho Marx,  once filled in for him in Marx Brothers publicity photos for the film Go West, despite an almost 25-year age difference.

His memoirs, The Wicked Wit of the West: The last great Golden-Age screenwriter shares the hilarity and heartaches of working with Groucho, Garland, Gleason, Burns, Berle, Benny & many more, was published posthumously in January 2009 by Ben Yehuda Press.

Death
Brecher died November 17, 2008. He was survived by his wife and three stepchildren.

References

Further reading

Articles
 Mok, Michael (December 27, 1936). "Without Trying, E. Cantor Found First Rate Gagman". The Indianapolis Star.
 Press Staff (March 21, 1937). "Youth Pens Radio Gags: Fellow Who Jibbed Milt Berle Becomes His Author for Network Show". The Pittsburgh Press.
 Kaufmann, Wolf (December 16, 1940). "Hedda Hopper's Hollywood: Who-dunit?". The Herald-News.
 Brecher, Irving (October 8, 1979). "Marx Brothers Revolutionized Early Years of Film Comedies". Asbury Park Press.
 Schwartz, Ben (April 2006). "Old School: Irving Brecher is the last of a generation's gagmen". Written By. pp. 38-39, 40-41, 55

Books
 Server, Lee (1987). "Irving Brecher". Screenwriter: Words Become Pictures. pp. 49-50, 51-52, 53-54, 55-56, 57-58, 59-60, 61-62, 63-64, 65-66.

External links 
 
 
 Variety: Vaudeville vet Irving Brecher dies

1914 births
2008 deaths
American radio writers
American male screenwriters
Writers from New York City
Writers from Palm Springs, California
Burials at Hillside Memorial Park Cemetery
Film directors from New York City
Film directors from California
Screenwriters from New York (state)
Screenwriters from California
20th-century American male writers
20th-century American screenwriters